Big Brother Schweiz is a Swiss version of the reality television franchise Big Brother. The Swiss version is based on the original Dutch Big Brother produced by Endemol. It has had a total of two seasons and has no plan to have another series.

The first season aired in 2000 and was a huge hit with Swiss audience so the sophomore season followed soon. Although not being as successful as the original series, season 2 proved to be a rating hit as well. However TV3, the station that aired Big Brother, was shut down at the end of 2001 due to financial problems and as of now, no other Swiss channel has shown interest in reactivating the show.

However Big Brother Germany has since allowed members of the German-speaking public of Switzerland to audition for its version of Big Brother and following 2001 has aired in Switzerland.

Details

Season 1
Season 1 of Big brother Switzerland was produced by Endemol. It ran from September 3, 2000 to December 30, 2000. Lasting a total of 106 days. During the first season there were seven evictions and a total of three voluntary exits. Some highlights of the season were the voluntary exit by Nadim immediately following Mashas eviction he claimed that he could not live in the house without Masha. After the eviction of Remo the world saw a first an all female final three. Daniela ultimately won the season becoming the second ever female winner of Big Brother. She won 150,000 CHF (US$170,000).

Contestants

Nominations Table

Season 2

Contestants

Nominations Table

Trivia
Total number of days on air: 212 days
Total number of housemates: 27 Housemates
Total number of housemates that walked: 6 Housemates
Total number of ejections : 0 Housemates

External links
 BB 2 Club at Bluewin
Big brother news site

Switzerland
2000 Swiss television series debuts
2001 Swiss television series endings
Swiss reality television series
2000s Swiss television series
German-language television shows
TV3 (Swiss TV channel) original programming